Marcelo Godri (born February 20, 1987 in Blumenau) is a Brazilian footballer who plays for Votuporanguense as defender.

Career statistics

References

External links

1987 births
Living people
People from Blumenau
Brazilian footballers
Association football defenders
Campeonato Brasileiro Série B players
Campeonato Brasileiro Série C players
Campeonato Brasileiro Série D players
Clube Atlético Bragantino players
Esporte Clube Santo André players
São Bernardo Futebol Clube players
Atlético Monte Azul players
Grêmio Barueri Futebol players
Grêmio Osasco Audax Esporte Clube players
Treze Futebol Clube players
Esporte Clube Taubaté players
Clube Atlético Votuporanguense players
Sportspeople from Santa Catarina (state)